İkizce is a town and district of Ordu Province, Turkey.

İkizce may also refer to:

 İkizce, Bilecik, a village in the district of Bilecik, Bilecik Province, Turkey
 İkizce, Gölbaşı, a neighborhood of the district of Gölbaşı, Ankara Province, Turkey
 İkizce, İvrindi, a village
 İkizce, Kahta, a village in the district of Kahta, Adıyaman Province, Turkey
 İkizce, Kaş, a village in the district of Kaş, Antalya Province, Turkey
 İkizce, Laçin